Tromsdalen Church or the Arctic Cathedral is a parish church of the Church of Norway in Tromsø Municipality in Troms og Finnmark county, Norway. It is located in the Tromsdalen valley on the east side of the city of Tromsø. It is the church for the Tromsøysund parish which is part of the Tromsø domprosti (arch-deanery) in the Diocese of Nord-Hålogaland. The modern concrete and metal church was built in a long church style in 1965 using plans drawn up by architect Jan Inge Hovig. The church seats about 600 people.

Name
Once known as Tromsdalen Church or Tromsøysund Church, the church is commonly nicknamed the Ishavskatedralen which literally means "The Cathedral of the Arctic Sea" or simply the "Arctic Cathedral". Despite its nickname, it is a parish church and not, in fact, a cathedral as it is commonly called.

Construction
The church was designed by architect Jan Inge Hovig and is built mainly of concrete. The main contractor for the construction was Ing. F. Selmer A/S Tromsø.  The church is one of the most notable churches in Tromsø due to its design, although Tromsø does have other churches of interest, such as the Protestant Tromsø Cathedral, which is noted for being the only wooden cathedral in Norway, and the Catholic Cathedral of Our Lady, Tromsø.

The groundbreaking of the church was 1 April 1964 and it was completed in 1965. The new church was consecrated on 19 November 1965 by the Bishop Monrad Norderval. The church is built out of cast-in-place aluminium-coated concrete panels.

In 1972, a glass mosaic was added to the eastern side, made by Victor Sparre. The church acquired an organ built by Grönlunds Orgelbyggeri in 2005, with three manuals, pedals, 42 stops, and 2940 pipes. It replaced the old opus nr. 12 organ delivered by Vestlandske Orgelverksted, Hareid, which had 22 voices and 124 keys.

Gallery

See also
List of churches in Nord-Hålogaland
Church of Norway
Tromsø Cathedral – the Cathedral of the Diocese of Nord-Hålogaland

References

External links 

The Arctic Cathedral

Churches in Tromsø
Churches in Troms
20th-century Church of Norway church buildings
Churches completed in 1965
1965 establishments in Norway
Culture of the Arctic
Modernist architecture in Norway